The 1992 Rugby League World Cup final was the conclusive game of the 1989–1992 Rugby League World Cup tournament and was played between Great Britain and Australia on 24 October 1992 at Wembley Stadium in London, England. Australia won the final by 10 points to 6 in front of an international record crowd of 73,631. Australia, the defending champions, won the Rugby League World Cup for the 7th time.

The crowd of 73,631 at Wembley set a new international rugby league attendance record, eclipsing the previous record of 70,204 established during the first test of the 1932 Ashes series at the Sydney Cricket Ground.

Background

Great Britain
The Mal Reilly coached Great Britain started their World Cup campaign on 11 November 1989 when they defeated New Zealand 10–6 at Central Park in Wigan. Until the Final, The Lions won another 4 games while losing 3.

Nine of the 17 selected players for the Lions were from the 1992 RFL champions Wigan.

Results

Australia
Australia began their World Cup campaign with a 22–14 win over New Zealand in the third test of the 1989 Trans-Tasman series in Auckland on 23 July 1989. The Bob Fulton coached Kangaroos would win all 8 of their qualifying games.

Seven of the players selected for Australia were members of the Brisbane Broncos 1992 NSWRL premiership winning team.

Australia were the defending World Cup Champions and had won all three World Cup Finals since 1975. The Kangaroos had won the 1988 Rugby League World Cup Final 25–12 over New Zealand at Eden Park in Auckland.

In the fortnight prior to the World Cup Final (following the 1992 NSWRL Grand Final), the Australians embarked on a mini three game tour of England, essentially using the games as selection trial for the Final at Wembley. The Australians wore a non-traditional mostly white jumper with a green and gold diamond pattern in the shape of Kit supplier Umbro.

The Australian squad for their WCF Tour was:
Mal Meninga (c), Allan Langer (vc), Tim Brasher, Willie Carne, John Cartwright, Bradley Clyde, Brad Fittler, David Gillespie, Brad Godden, Michael Hancock, Paul Harragon, Chris Johns, Glenn Lazarus, Bob Lindner, Graham Mackay, Steve Renouf, Mark Sargent, Paul Sironen, Kerrod Walters, Kevin Walters, Steve Walters.

Of the selected squad, only team vice captain Allan Langer, Paul Sironen and David Gillespie had played in Australia's 1988 World Cup Final win over New Zealand. All three would go on to play in the Final at Wembley playing in the same positions and wearing the same numbers (7, 11 and 14 respectively) they had done four years earlier at Eden Park.

Results

Head to Head

Before the final, Australia and Great Britain had played each other 119 times, with Australia winning 57 times, Great Britain 57 and 5 draws. Australia had not lost a test series or a World Cup to Great Britain (or England) since the 1972 World Cup.

Australia and Great Britain had met in three previous World Cup Finals; 1970 at Headingley Stadium in Leeds (won 12–7 by Australia), 1972 at Stade de Gerland in Lyon, France (the game finished in a 10–10 draw but the Lions were awarded the Cup after finishing on top of the table), and 1977 at the Sydney Cricket Ground (won 13–12 by Australia).

Host venue
As they had done in 1988, Australia won the right to host the World Cup Final. However, in the interests of rugby league and although they were confident of a sell-out if the game was held in Australia after capacity crowds attended all three Ashes Series tests earlier in the year against Great Britain, with the potential for a much larger attendance since at the time Lang Park in Brisbane could only hold 32,500, and the Sydney Football Stadium could only seat 42,500, the Australian Rugby League (ARL) agreed to the Rugby Football League (RFL) hosting the final at the 82,000 capacity Wembley Stadium in London.

Match details

First half
The first half of the World Cup Final was a tight affair. The Lions took the lead early thanks to a penalty goal from Deryck Fox after a spilled bomb in front of the posts by debuting Kangaroos fullback Tim Brasher. Fox put up an attacking bomb and Brasher was tackled by Lions fullback Joe Lydon as he attempted to catch the ball. From there Steve Renouf dived on the loose ball that was only 2 metres in front of the posts and was ruled to be offside. From then on Fox and Kangaroos captain Mal Meninga traded penalty goals until the half with Great Britain going into the break with a 6–4 lead.

Great Britain were lucky to have a full complement on the field from about the 20 minute mark of the final after hooker Martin Dermott had caught Australian five-eighth Brad Fittler with an elbow to the face. However Dermott was cautioned by referee Hale rather than sent off. While Meninga kicked a penalty goal, Fittler went to the sidelines where he was cleared of serious injury and returned to the game without being replaced. At half time, Kangaroos doctor Nathan Gibbs diagnosed a hairline fracture of his cheek bone, but cleared him to play on.

Great Britain wasn't without its own problems though. Early in the first half fullback Joe Lydon picked up an ankle injury and he would be eventually replaced by Alan Tait in the second half. The Lions would also lose centre Gary Connolly to a leg injury which would see him replaced by a former Welsh rugby union international, John Devereux.

Second half
Into the second half the match was becoming a struggle with neither team seriously threatening the others line. The closest either team came to scoring was when Australian winger Willie Carne looked to have scored in the corner but the final pass from Meninga was ruled forward. The home side were still leading 6–4 with only 12 minutes remaining. The only try of the match was then set up by Australian replacement back Kevin Walters who, with a clever cut-out pass, put his Brisbane Broncos teammate Steve Renouf into a gap not covered by replacement Lions centre John Devereux (Walters had replaced lock forward Bradley Clyde who left the field with a dislocated shoulder). Renouf, in his debut test for Australia, then raced 20 metres to score in the corner. Meninga's sideline conversion of Renouf's try gave Australia what would be a match winning 10–6 lead. The rain started pouring midway through the second half and Australia was able to hold Great Britain out and maintain their lead until the final siren.

Australian hooker Steve Walters was named the man-of-the-match for the 1992 World Cup Final.

Broadcast
The match was broadcast into the United Kingdom by the BBC with commentary from Ray French and Alex Murphy.

The match was telecast live late at night throughout Australia on the Nine Network, with commentary provided by Ray Warren and former Australian test players Peter Sterling and Paul Vautin, with sideline comments from Chris Bombolas. The game broke Australia's midnight-to-dawn television ratings record which was set a year earlier by the rugby union's 1991 Rugby World Cup Final in which Australia had defeated England at Twickenham Stadium in London.

References

Rugby League World Cup finals
World
World Cup Final
Events at Wembley Stadium
1989–1992 Rugby League World Cup
Rugby League World Cup
Rugby League World Cup Final
Rugby League World Cup Final